Cannibal squeeze or suicide squeeze is a type of squeeze in bridge or whist, in which a defender is squeezed by a card played by his partner. Normally, this occurs with less-than-perfect defense, but there are also legitimate positions where the defense could not have prevailed.

Examples
 West is on lead. If he cashes the high heart, a club is thrown from the dummy, and East is squeezed. Whichever card East discards, the declarer will take two tricks in that suit. Instead, West must lead a diamond to protect the partner from subsequent endplay (if he returns a club, the declarer will take the King and put East in with another club, forcing him to lead into AQ).

The most common position for a legitimate suicide squeeze occurs when a side suit is "tangled" (neither side can lead it without giving up a trick), and another suit is protected by the partner of the player on lead, as in the following diagram:
 West is to lead; if he leads a diamond, it will "untangle" the suit for the declarer, who will take two diamond tricks. However, when he leads the high heart, he induces a simple squeeze on his partner, who must either discard the high 7 or unguard the diamond king. (Dummy has an idle card, and East is to play before the declarer.) Again declarer will take two tricks.

References
 Hugh Kelsey, Kelsey on Squeeze Play (Master Bridge)

Contract bridge squeezes